Tyrophagus is a genus of mites in the family Acaridae.

Species
 Tyrophagus casei Oudemans, 1910
 Tyrophagus curvipenis Fain & Fauvel, 1993
 Tyrophagus debrivorus Chinniah & Mohanasundaram, 1996
 Tyrophagus glossinarum Fain, 1985
 Tyrophagus houstoni (Fain, 1986)
 Tyrophagus jingdezhenensis Jiang-Zhenta, 1993
 Tyrophagus lini Oudemans, 1924
 Tyrophagus longior (Gervais, 1844)
 Tyrophagus mimlongior Jiang, 1993
 Tyrophagus neiswanderi Johnson & Bruce, 1965
 Tyrophagus neotropicus (Oudemans, 1917)
 Tyrophagus palmarum Oudemans, 1924
 Tyrophagus perniciosus Zakhvatkin, 1941
 Tyrophagus putrescentiae (Schrank, 1781)
 Tyrophagus robertsonae Lynch, 1989
 Tyrophagus savasi Lynch, 1989
 Tyrophagus similis Volgin, 1949
 Tyrophagus tropicus Robertson, 1959

See also
 Cheese mite

References

Acaridae
Taxa named by Anthonie Cornelis Oudemans